, is a lake located to the east of Mt. Fuji in Yamakita town, Ashigarakami district, in the Kanagawa Prefecture of Japan.  The lake and its surroundings are frequently visited during fall to admire autumn colors.

History
This Lake was created due to construction of the Miho dam in 1978.

Around
 Nakagawa Spa
 Lake Tanzawa Campsite

Access
By Fujikyu Shonan Bus from Odakyu Line Shin-Matsuda Station, or JR Gotemba Line Yaga Station.

References

See also
Tanzawa Mountains

Tanzawa
Landforms of Kanagawa Prefecture
Tourist attractions in Kanagawa Prefecture